Sovetsky District (U Roŋgo kundem) is an administrative and municipal district (raion), one of the fourteen in the Mari El Republic, Russia. It is located in the center of the republic. Its administrative center is the urban locality (an urban-type settlement) of Sovetsky. As of the 2010 Census, the total population of the district was 31,081, with the population of the administrative center accounting for 34.3% of that number.

Administrative and municipal status
Within the framework of administrative divisions, Sovetsky District is one of the fourteen in the republic. It is divided into 1 urban-type settlement (an administrative division with the administrative center in the urban-type settlement (inhabited locality) of Sovetsky) and 7 rural okrugs, all of which comprise 140 rural localities. As a municipal division, the district is incorporated as Sovetsky Municipal District. Sovetsky Urban-Type Settlement is incorporated into an urban settlement, and the seven rural okrugs are incorporated into seven rural settlements within the municipal district. The urban-type settlement of Sovetsky serves as the administrative center of both the administrative and municipal district.

References

Notes

Sources

Districts of Mari El
